The Charles A. Weyerhaeuser and Musser Houses are historic houses in Little Falls, Minnesota that were the homes of Charles A. Weyerhauser and Richard Musser, founders of the Pine Tree Lumber Company, a business that played a major role in the growth of Little Falls, as it built a strong lumber industry within the town. The houses were added to the National Register of Historic Places on September 5, 1985. The houses are now the location of the Linden Hill Historic Estate.

The houses were the location of a concert by famous pianist Van Cliburn after he won the inaugural International Tchaikovsky Competition.

Description
From the official nomination form:

References

External links
Linden Hill Historic Estate's website

National Register of Historic Places in Morrison County, Minnesota
Houses completed in 1898
Houses on the National Register of Historic Places in Minnesota